Alfred Speakman (August 24, 1880 – November 4, 1943) was a politician from Alberta, Canada.

Early life
Speakman was born August 24, 1880 in Dundee, Scotland to James Speakman and Mary Hannah Farrar, where he attended the High School of Dundee, before his family emigrated to Canada in 1891. Speakman married Elva Pearl Soley, with whom he had one daughter, Mary Elva.

Federal political career
Speakman was elected to the House of Commons of Canada in the 1921 federal election in the district of Red Deer under the banner of the United Farmers of Alberta.  He was re-elected in 1925, 1926 and 1930.

In the 1935 federal election he ran as a member of the Cooperative Commonwealth Federation and finished a distant third to Social Credit candidate Eric Joseph Poole.

Provincial political career
Speakman was instrumental in the Unity Movement which united Alberta's opposition parties against the Social Credit government. On October 12, 1937 Speakman, as a long-serving Member of Parliament, brought delegates from the United Farmers, Conservatives, Liberals and some disillusioned Social Crediters to a conference in Red Deer that brought the Unity coalition together.

Speakman ran as an independent in Red Deer in the 1940 Alberta general election and was elected with a comfortable vote margin after ballot transfers. Speakman served as an independent in the Unity caucus until his death in 1943.

Speakman served briefly as Leader of the Official Opposition in Alberta in 1942.

Speakman died suddenly at his home in Edmonton after suffering from poor health on November 4, 1943.

References

External links
Legislative Assembly of Alberta Members Listing
 

1880 births
1943 deaths
Politicians from Dundee
People educated at the High School of Dundee
Members of the House of Commons of Canada from Alberta
United Farmers of Alberta MPs
Independent Alberta MLAs
Co-operative Commonwealth Federation candidates for the Canadian House of Commons
British emigrants to Canada